Lenka Kopčová (born 3 November 1999) is a Slovak footballer who plays as a forward and has appeared for the Slovakia women's national team.

Career
Kopčová has been capped for the Slovakia national team, appearing for the team during the 2019 FIFA Women's World Cup qualifying cycle.

References

External links
 
 
 

1999 births
Living people
Slovak women's footballers
Slovakia women's international footballers
Women's association football forwards
FC Slovan Liberec players
Expatriate women's footballers in the Czech Republic
Slovak expatriate sportspeople in the Czech Republic
Czech Women's First League players